Robert Jocelyn, 2nd Earl of Roden KP, PC (Ire) (26 October 1756 – 29 June 1820) was an Irish peer, soldier and politician. He was styled The Honourable from his birth to 1771, and then Viscount Jocelyn from 1771 to 1797. He was the eldest son of the 1st Earl of Roden and Lady Anne Hamilton, daughter of James Hamilton, 1st Earl of Clanbrassil.

He was a professional soldier, and the company of dragoons he commanded, nicknamed "the Foxhunters", gained much notoriety during the Irish Rebellion of 1798. In particular, they played a leading role in the Gibbet Rath massacre at the Curragh of Kildare on 29 May 1798, where 350–500 insurgents, who had surrendered, were killed in cold blood. In defence of Roden it can be said that he acted on the orders of his superior officer, General Duff, and that the action was widely condoned at the time. In September his dragoons played a crucial part in the final defeat of the invading French army at the Battle of Ballinamuck: Lord Roden accepted the surrender of General Humbert.

He became Earl of Roden in 1797 after the death of his father Robert Jocelyn, 1st Earl of Roden and was appointed a Knight of the Order of St Patrick on 13 November 1806. Jocelyn represented Maryborough in the Irish House of Commons between 1776 and 1778. Between 1783 and 1797, he sat as Member of Parliament for Dundalk, with his brother George serving as the other Member. He turned down a Marquisate due to the lack of his fortune which was needed to uphold this position.

He was appointed Custos Rotulorum of Louth for life in 1820.

Family
He married:
 Frances Theodosia Bligh (died 1802), daughter of the Right Reverend Robert Bligh, Dean of Elphin and Frances Winthrop, on 5 February 1788 at St Andrew's Church, Dublin  with issue:
 Robert Jocelyn, 3rd Earl of Roden (27 October 1788 – 20 March 1870)
 James Bligh Jocelyn (died July 1812)
 Thomas Jocelyn (died February 1816)
 George Jocelyn
 Frances Theodosia Jocelyn (1795 – May 1820), married Richard Wingfield, 5th Viscount Powerscourt
 Anne Jocelyn (died October 1822)
 Juliana-Anne Orde, daughter of John Orde of Weetwood Hall, on 5 July 1804, Edinburgh, with issue:
 John Jocelyn (1805–1869)
 Major Augustus George Frederick Jocelyn (1811–1887)

References

1756 births
1820 deaths
Jocelyn, Robert Jocelyn, Viscount
Jocelyn, Robert Jocelyn, Viscount
Jocelyn, Robert Jocelyn, Viscount
Knights of St Patrick
Members of the Privy Council of Ireland
Irish representative peers
Members of the Irish House of Lords
Members of the Parliament of Ireland (pre-1801) for Queen's County constituencies
Members of the Parliament of Ireland (pre-1801) for County Louth constituencies
Earls of Roden